Dilan Jayasingha (born March 14, 1980), known professionally as Dilan Jay, is an American actor, singer, and producer. He was the first artist from his country of heritage (Sri Lanka) to place on the U.S. Billboard charts and have a No. 1 on MTV's Most Popular Music videos. He is considered one of the top artists in Sri Lanka with ten No. 1 musical hits, 2 pop albums, 4 hip hop albums, and 2 acoustic albums. In 2022, he released a feature, "January" with rapper Money Man. In 2022, his new pop album's tracks amassed over 2 million Spotify streams, and 3 million Youtube views. Dilan's collaborations include Ty Dolla $ign, producer from Black-Eyed Peas Keith Harris, Jacob Lutrell, and songwriter Darious Coleman.

Dilan started his music career under the pseudonym "DeLon" with the hit single "Jeevithe" that became one of the featured tracks on Yes FM’s official Sri Lankan tsunami release CD, followed with multiple No. 1 radio hits and accolades awarded to him by Derana’s Award show. His musical style ranges from rap, dubstep, acoustic guitar, piano, and pop.

Dilan spent 10 years as a rapper under his former pseudonym, DeLon, producing 4 albums and 2 mixtapes. He is known by his fans as the "King of Ceylon" — "Ceylon" representing Sri Lanka – and has collaborated with American songwriter Jacob Luttrell, singer Ty Dolla $ign, and other prominent producers in Sri Lanka. Dilan retired from his rapping career, and simultaneously dropped his DeLon pseudonym, in 2018. Adopting Dilan Jay to help represent his new musical direction, Dilan released his debut singer-songwriter album 3.14 in 2018 and Songs About Love and Other Stuff in 2019. In 2022 Dilan released 4 new singles in the Pop/R&B genre.

Film career 
Dilan began his acting career in 2010 by starring in Sri Lankan film, Looking Back on the Lion (2010) A.K.A Sinhawalokanaya, which is recognized as a national heritage and the first Sri Lankan cricket film.

Dilan's first American film debut is Hollow Point (2019), an action film directed by Daniel Zirilli, which won 4 film festival awards, and was picked up by Vertical Entertainment.

Delon discography
The Connection (2005)
Unstoppable (2008)
S.O.N (Something Out of Nothing) (2011)
 Awake (2011)

Dilan Jay Discography
Kick Back (2019)
Favorite Song (2019)
Ophelia (2020)
Better Days (2020)
Pineapple Life (2020)
I Believe in You (2020) 
Echo of My Soul (2020)
Love Will Bring You back (2020)
Oh Cherie (2020)
My Road (2020) 
Be Your Man Tonight (2022)
All My Love (2022)
Cool (2022)
Glad I Came Out Tonight (2022)
January (2022)
Where Do We Go (2022)

References

External links
Dilan's official website

Living people
Record producers from California
Hip hop record producers
American rappers of Asian descent
Sri Lankan emigrants to the United States
Sinhalese musicians
1980 births